"Children of the Revolution" is a song by T. Rex, written by Marc Bolan. It was a UK No. 2 hit single in September 1972. The song broke their sequence of four official single releases all reaching No. 1 on the UK Singles Chart ("Hot Love", "Get It On", "Telegram Sam", "Metal Guru"). It did not receive a regular album release.

Recording

"Children of the Revolution"
"Children of the Revolution" was first recorded at Ascot Sound Studios for the film Born to Boogie, and featured Elton John on piano and Ringo Starr on a drum kit.

A longer version of the song, at over twelve minutes in length, was recorded on 31 March 1972 at Copenhagen's Rosenberg Studios during sessions for the band's third album The Slider. Flo & Eddie, formerly of the Turtles, contribute backing vocals to this version of the release. The tape box contained the note that the jam was "for the attention of Ringo".

The recording of the single version of the song began during the sessions for the Tanx album in August 1972. The track was mixed at Air Studios in mid August before being release on 8 September.

"Jitterbug Love"
"Jitterbug Love" was initially recorded on 2 August 1972 at the Château d'Hérouville in France, however only the drum track recorded at this session made it to the final release. Additional instrumentation was added at Air Studios on 11 August 1972.

"Sunken Rags"
"Sunken Rags" was recorded during the last of the sessions for The Slider at Rosenberg Studios, Copenhagen in March 1972.

Cover versions
In 1986, Violent Femmes released the version of the single from their album The Blind Leading the Naked.

In 1989, Greater Manchester artist Baby Ford released an acid house version on the Rhythm King record label. This cover was a No. 53 hit in the UK Singles Chart in 1989.

In 2001, Bono handled lead vocals on a version for the Baz Luhrmann film Moulin Rouge! and the accompanying soundtrack. 

In June 2020, it was announced that Kesha would record a cover of the song along with Marc Bolan's son, Rolan, on backing vocals. The tribute album containing the recording, Angelheaded Hipster: The Songs of Marc Bolan & T. Rex, was released in September 2020.

Legacy

Dinaw Mengestu's 2017 novel The Beautiful Things That Heaven Bears was originally published in the UK as Children of the Revolution, and includes lyrics from the song within the story.

In 2014, Sonic Youth vocalist and guitarist Thurston Moore named "Children of the Revolution" as one of his 25 favourite songs.

Charts

T. Rex version

Baby Ford version

Certifications

See also
List of number-one singles of 1972 (Ireland)

References

1972 singles
1972 songs
EMI Records singles
Irish Singles Chart number-one singles
Reprise Records singles
Song recordings produced by Tony Visconti
Songs written for films
Songs written by Marc Bolan
T. Rex (band) songs
Scorpions (band) songs
Violent Femmes songs